Łukasz Zakrzewski (born 1984) is a Polish sailor, ice sailor.

Zakrzewski is a member of Mazurski Klub Żeglarski Mikołajki team. He started ice-boating at age 7. He is a senior world vice-champion (2006 World Championships), junior world vice-champion and junior European vice-champion in sailing.

Achievements

References

External links
 Łukasz Zakrzewski- Polish Sailing Encyclopedia (pl.)

1984 births
Ice yachting
Living people
Polish male sailors (sport)
Place of birth missing (living people)